Muffin Spencer-Devlin (born October 25, 1953) is an American professional golfer who played on the LPGA Tour.

She was born in Piqua, Ohio and joined the LPGA in 1979. She is openly gay, and in 1996 became the first LPGA player to come out as gay.

Spencer-Devlin made a cameo appearance as a member of Starfleet Medical in the feature film Star Trek Generations that was released in 1994, and made a brief appearance in "The Chute", the third episode of the 1995 series Star Trek: Voyager.

Professional wins

LPGA Tour wins (3)

References

External links

American female golfers
Rollins Tars women's golfers
LPGA Tour golfers
Golfers from Ohio
Lesbian sportswomen
LGBT golfers
LGBT people from Ohio
American LGBT sportspeople
People from Piqua, Ohio
1953 births
Living people